Huntingdon Armory is a historic National Guard armory located at Huntingdon, Huntingdon County, Pennsylvania.  The administration building was built in 1930 and the drill hall in 1937.  It is a one-story, "T"-shaped yellow brick building in the Moderne style.

It was added to the National Register of Historic Places in 1989.

References

Armories on the National Register of Historic Places in Pennsylvania
Moderne architecture in Pennsylvania
Government buildings completed in 1937
Buildings and structures in Huntingdon County, Pennsylvania
National Register of Historic Places in Huntingdon County, Pennsylvania